There are a number of Elementary schools named Jackson Elementary School:
 Andrew Jackson Elementary School in Philadelphia
 Jackson Elementary School (Santa Ana, California)
 Jackson Elementary School (Green Bay, Wisconsin)
 Jackson Elementary School (Abbotsford, Canada) 
 Jackson City School or Herbert W. Spencer School (Jackson, Kentucky)

See also
 Jackson School (disambiguation)